Where the Ancient Forests Rustle is a 1956 West German drama film directed by Alfons Stummer and starring Willy Fritsch, Josefin Kipper and Carl Möhner. It was one of a large number of heimatfilm made during the decade.

The film's sets were designed by the art director Gabriel Pellon.

Synopsis
The widowed owner of a Hamburg construction company takes his young son on holiday to the Austrian Alps, but his obsession with work drives a wedge between them.

Cast

References

Bibliography 
 Harald Höbusch. "Mountain of Destiny": Nanga Parbat and Its Path Into the German Imagination. Boydell & Brewer, 2016.

External links 
 

1956 films
West German films
German drama films
1956 drama films
1950s German-language films
Gloria Film films
Films set in Austria
Films set in the Alps
Films set in forests
1950s German films